The Florida Film Critics Circle Award for Best Documentary is an award given by the Florida Film Critics Circle to honor the finest achievements in filmmaking.

Winners

1990s

2000s

2010s

2020s 

Florida Film Critics Circle Awards
Lists of films by award
American documentary film awards